The Norrbotten Brigade, also IB 19, NB 19 or MekB 19, was a Swedish Army armoured brigade located in the province of Norrbotten. Most of the brigade was trained at Norrbotten Regiment (I 19) in Boden.

History 
Norrbotten Brigade was originally an infantry brigade which in 1964 became the second of a total of five brigades, which was organised as an arctic brigade.

In 1994, the brigade, along with the regiment (I 19/P 5) formed the Norrland Mechanised Brigade (MekB 19). The brigade consisted of two tank battalions equipped with Leopard 2s and Combat Vehicle 90s, and two mechanised battalions equipped with CV90.

The unit was disbanded as a result of the disarmament policies set forward in the Defence Act of 2000.

Heraldry and traditions
The Norrbotten Regiment and Norrbotten Brigade inherited heraldry and traditions from the Norrbotten Regiment.

Coat of arms
The coat of arms of the Norrbotten Regiment and Norrbotten Brigade (MekB 19) 1994–2000 was also used by the Norrbotten Armoured Battalion (P 5) 1957–1975. Blazon: "Azure, powdered with estoiles or, the provincial badge of Västerbotten, a reindeer courant argent, armed and langued gules. The shield surmounted two arms in fess, embowed and vambraced, the hands holding swords in saltire, or".

March
By the end of the 1800s, Norrbotten Regiment adopted the march "" (Sundgrén). In 1916 it adopted the march "" which was used from 1916 to 1927 together with Karlskrona Grenadier Regiment (I 7). Karlskrona Grenadier Regiment used the march as an inheritance from the Småland Hussar Regiment (K 4). After the regiment was amalgamated into a brigade in 1994, the brigade came to use the march. From 2000 it is used again by the regiment.

Commanding officers
Brigade commander from 1949 to 2000.

1949–1993: ?
1993–1994: Bengt Jerkland
1994–1999: Lars-Gunnar Nilsson
1999–2000: Per Lodin

Names, designations and locations

See also
 Norrbotten Regiment
 List of Swedish Army brigades

Footnotes

References

Notes

Print

Further reading

Brigades of the Swedish Army
Military units and formations established in 1949
Military units and formations disestablished in 2000
Disbanded units and formations of Sweden
Boden Garrison
1949 establishments in Sweden
2000 disestablishments in Sweden